The Former Bank of England building at 82 King Street, Manchester, is a historic banking building. It has been recognised as a Grade I listed building, maintained by Manchester City Council. It was designed by Charles Robert Cockerell and constructed in the 1840s, being completed in 1846.

It was occupied by the local agency of the Bank of England from 1847 to 1970, and the Bank returned to the site in 1998, moving into some of the modern offices built at the rear of the original building.

See also

Grade I listed buildings in Manchester
Listed buildings in Manchester-M2

References

Grade I listed buildings in Manchester
Former bank buildings